Caloptilia alchimiella (commonly known as yellow-triangle slender) is a moth of the family Gracillariidae. It is found in Europe and the Near East.

Forewings purplish - ferruginous ; dorsum suffused with yellow towards base ; a large triangular yellow median costal blotch, apex often rounded. Hindwings dark grey. . 

The moth flies from May to July depending on the location.

The larvae feed on Quercus species, Castanea sativa and Fagus sylvatica.

References

External links
Microlepidoptera.nl 
Lepidoptera of Belgium
Bladmineerders.nl 
UK Moths

alchimiella
Moths described in 1763
Moths of Europe
Moths of Asia
Taxa named by Giovanni Antonio Scopoli